Ecomodernism is an environmental philosophy which argues that technological development can protect nature and improve human wellbeing through eco-economic decoupling, i.e., by separating economic growth from environmental impacts.

Description 
Ecomodernism embraces substituting natural ecological services with energy, technology, and synthetic solutions as long as they help reduce impact on environment. Among other things, ecomodernists embrace agricultural intensification, genetically modified and synthetic foods (for their reduced usage of herbicides and pesticides), fish from aquaculture farms, desalination and waste recycling, urbanization, and replacing low power-density energy sources (e.g. firewood in low-income countries, which leads to deforestation) with high power-density sources as long as their net impact on environment is lower (nuclear power plants, and advanced renewables). Key among the goals of an ecomodern environmental ethic is the use of technology to intensify human activity and make more room for wild nature.

Debates that form the foundation of ecomodernism were born from disappointment in anti-scientific policies of traditional organizations who categorically denied zero-emission energy sources such as nuclear power, thus leading to actual increase of reliance of fossil gas and increase of emissions instead of reduction (e.g. Energiewende). Coming from evidence-based, scientific and pragmatic positions, ecomodernism engages in the debate on how to best protect natural environments, how to accelerate decarbonization to mitigate climate change, and how to accelerate the economic and social development of the world's poor. In these debates, ecomodernism distinguishes itself from other schools of thought, including ecological economics, degrowth, population reduction, laissez-faire economics, the "soft energy" path, and central planning. Ecomodernism draws on American pragmatism, political ecology, evolutionary economics, and modernism. Diversity of ideas and dissent are claimed values in order to avoid the intolerance born of extremism and dogmatism.

Ecomodernist organisations have been established in many countries, including Germany, Finland, and Sweden. While the word 'ecomodernism' has only been used to describe modernist environmentalism since 2013, the term has a longer history in academic design writing and Ecomodernist ideas were developed within a number of earlier texts, including Martin Lewis's Green Delusions,  Stewart Brand's Whole Earth Discipline and Emma Marris's Rambunctious Garden. In their 2015 manifesto, 18 self-professed ecomodernists—including scholars from the Breakthrough Institute, Harvard University, Jadavpur University, and the Long Now Foundation—sought to clarify the movement's vision: "we affirm one long-standing environmental ideal, that humanity must shrink its impacts on the environment to make more room for nature, while we reject another, that human societies must harmonize with nature to avoid economic and ecological collapse."

An Ecomodernist Manifesto 
In April 2015, a group of 18 self-described ecomodernists collectively published An Ecomodernist Manifesto.

Reception and criticism 
Some environmental journalists have praised An Ecomodernist Manifesto. At The New York Times, Eduardo Porter wrote approvingly of ecomodernism's alternative approach to sustainable development. In an article titled "Manifesto Calls for an End to 'People Are Bad' Environmentalism", Slate's Eric Holthaus wrote "It's inclusive, it's exciting, and it gives environmentalists something to fight for for a change." The science journal Nature editorialized the manifesto.

Ecomodernism has been criticized for inadequately recognizing what Holly Jean Buck, Assistant Professor of Environment and Sustainability, says is the exploitative, violent and unequal dimensions of technological modernisation. Sociologist Eileen Crist, Associate Professor Emerita, observed that ecomodernism is founded on a western philosophy of humanism with no regard to "nonhuman freedoms".  Of the Manifesto Crist says  Human Geographer Rosemary-Claire Collard and co-authors assert that ecomodernism is incompatible with neoliberal capitalism, despite the philosophy's claims to the contrary. By contrast, in his book "Ecomodernism: Technology, Politics and the Climate Crisis" Jonathan Symons argues that ecomodernism belongs in the social democratic tradition, promoting a third way between laissez-faire and anti-capitalism, and calling for transformative state investments in technological transformation and human development.  Likewise, in "A sympathetic diagnosis of the Ecomodernist Manifesto", Paul Robbins and Sarah A. Moore describe the similarities and points of departure between ecomodernism and political ecology.

Another major strand of criticism towards ecomodernism comes from proponents of degrowth or the steady-state economy. Eighteen ecological economists published a long rejoinder titled "A Degrowth Response to an Ecomodernist Manifesto", writing "the ecomodernists provide neither a very inspiring blueprint for future development strategies nor much in the way of solutions to our environmental and energy woes."

At the Breakthrough Institute's annual Dialogue in June 2015, several environmental scholars offered a critique of ecomodernism. Bruno Latour argued that the modernity celebrated in An Ecomodernist Manifesto is a myth. Jenny Price argued that the manifesto offered a simplistic view of "humanity" and "nature", which she said are "made invisible" by talking about them in such broad terms.

See also 
Bright green environmentalism
Earthship
Ecological civilization
Ecological modernization
Environmental technology
Reflexive modernization
Solarpunk
Technogaianism
Utopian architecture

References

External links

Bright green environmentalism
 
Environmentalism
Environmental social science concepts
Environmental philosophy